BRL-15,572 is a drug which acts as a selective antagonist for the serotonin receptor subtype 5-HT1D, with around 60x selectivity over other related receptors. The 5-HT1D receptor has a very similar pharmacology to the closely related 5-HT1B receptor, and most older ligands for these receptors bind to both subtypes with approximately equal affinity, so development of compounds such as BRL-15572 which are able to selectively block the 5-HT1D subtype while leaving 5-HT1B unaffected, have been a significant advance which has helped scientists in researching the function of these serotonin receptor subtypes. One function of the 5-HT1D receptor this research has revealed is its role in modulating release of the neurotransmitter glutamate in the brain, as well as functions in regulation of cerebral blood pressure which are important in the pathogenesis of migraine headaches.

References 

5-HT1D antagonists
Secondary alcohols
meta-Chlorophenylpiperazines
Experimental drugs